MP United is a professional football club from the Northern Mariana Islands. It has been one of the most successful local clubs since founding date. The club has both men's and a women's team.

Current squad

Former players

  Christopher Aninzo

References

Football clubs in the Northern Mariana Islands